Ismail Ahmed Ismail Mohammed (born 7 July 1983), known by his patronymic Ismail Ahmed is a former Emirati footballer who played as a centre-back. Born in Morocco, he represents the United Arab Emirates at international level.

Personal life
Ismail Ahmed was born in Temara, Morocco, but moved to Yemen and Bahrain as a teenager to venture for his football passion. He was persuaded to play for the Bahraini national team, but rejected the offer to return to Morocco in order to represent his country's national side and league giants Raja Casablanca so he could head to Europe, but an injury ruined his career while the likes of Nordin Amrabat, Ayoub El Kaabi and Achraf Bencharki flourished. He soon accepted the offer to join Al Ain from his former club, FUS de Rabat, where he was granted Emirati citizenship. He retired in 2021.

Honours

Club
Al Ain
UAE Pro League: 2011–12, 2012–13, 2014–15, 2017–18
UAE League Cup: 2008–09
UAE President's Cup: 2008–09, 2013–14, 2017–18
UAE Super Cup: 2009, 2012, 2015
Emirati-Moroccan Super Cup: 2015
AFC Champions League runner-up: 2016
FIFA Club World Cup runner-up: 2018

International
UAE
 AFC Asian Cup third-place (1): 2015

Individual
AFC Champions League All-Star Squad: 2016

References

External links
 Ismail Ahmed at UAEProLeague
 
 
 
 Ismail Ahmed profile at Al Ain official site
 Ismail Ahmed statistics at Goalzz.com
 Ismail Ahmed at WorldFootball.net

Emirati footballers
United Arab Emirates international footballers
Moroccan footballers
Al Ain FC players
1983 births
Living people
Fath Union Sport players
Moroccan emigrants to the United Arab Emirates
2015 AFC Asian Cup players
2019 AFC Asian Cup players
Association football central defenders
Naturalized citizens of the United Arab Emirates
UAE Pro League players